Sher-e-Punjab (abbreviated as SP) is an Indian professional field hockey team named after  Sher-e-Punjab and based in Jalandhar, Punjab that plays in World Series Hockey. The team is currently led by Indian forward Prabhjot Singh and coached by former Indian coach Rajinder Singh. Surjeet Hockey Stadium in Jalandhar serves as the home ground of Sher-e-Punjab.

Sher-e-Punjab became the champions of the inaugural edition of WSH by defeating Pune Strykers 5–2 in the final. Deepak Thakur has scored most goals for the team (12 goals).

History

2012 season

Sher-e-Punjab begun their campaign with a 5–2 victory over Chennai Cheetahs at home. After being undefeated for three matches they lost consecutive matches from Delhi Wizards and Chandigarh Comets 1–2 and 1–3 respectively. But winning their next five matches gave them their berth in the semi-finals despite their captain, Prabhjot Singh, being out of play due to a hamstring injury. They were the first team to qualify for the playoffs. They defeated Bhopal Badshahs and Mumbai Marines both home and away. The team led the points table almost throughout the league phase due to their consistent performance. However, just one win in last four matches resulted in a number two finish at the end of league phase trailing Chandigarh Comets by three points.

Sher-e-Punjab faced Karnataka Lions (who finished number three in the league phase) in the semi-final. They conceded an early goal but went on to thrash the hosts 4–1 to enter the final. They faced and defeated Pune Strykers in the final 5–2 and thus became the first ever champions of WSH. Deepak Thakur scored the most goals for the team (12 goals). He finished number four overall.

Team Composition
The team is captained by Prabhjot Singh with Rajinder Singh as coach.

Fixtures and Results

2012

Statistics

Hat-tricks

References

See also
 World Series Hockey

World Series Hockey teams
Sport in Jalandhar
Sports clubs in Punjab, India
2012 establishments in Punjab, India
Organizations established in 2012